The Theater Square fountain is the largest fountain in the city of Rostov-on-Don, Russia.

After the construction of the theater. M. Gorky in 1936, next to it was equipped the Theater Square with a fountain in the center. The author of it was a young sculptor Yugene Vuchetich, the graduate of the Rostov Art College.

The fountain is a sculptural group of Atlanteans on a pedestal, popularly called "peasants with a bowl." The group is surrounded by images of frogs and turtles. There were rumors that Vuchetich, in retaliation for some "sins", gave the faces of animals the features of the faces of some city bosses. The sculptures were made of concrete on white cement.

During the Great Patriotic War, the fountain was destroyed, restored in the 1950s in full, as far as can be judged from the photo. But in the 1970s there were no frogs with turtles on the fountain. Perhaps in 20 years the sculptural elements have decayed, the living creatures have been removed altogether, and to support the "peasants" they have established a support under the center of the bowl, not hoping for the strength of the hands of concrete Atlanteans.

On the eve of the 250th anniversary of Rostov-on-Don, which was celebrated in 1999, the fountain was restored, giving it its original appearance. Only materials have changed: the podium is lined with natural stone, sculptures of atlantes, frogs and turtles are made in the technique of knocking out copper. In the evening, the fountain is illuminated with colored lights. For many decades the fountain never ceases to please its residents and visitors with its beauty.

References 

Tourist attractions in Rostov-on-Don
Monuments and memorials in Rostov-on-Don
Cultural heritage monuments in Rostov-on-Don
Cultural heritage monuments of regional significance in Rostov Oblast